Agrária is the rugby union sports team of the students' union of the Escola Superior Agrária de Coimbra (Agrarian School of Coimbra), based in Coimbra, Portugal. The Agrária rugby team has been a major contender in the Portuguese top level rugby union championships. It has men, women and children rugby teams.

Honors
Campeonato Nacional de Rugby Feminino: 
Winner (5): 2001/02, 2002/03, 2004/05, 2005/06, 2011/12
Taça de Portugal de Rugby Feminino: 
Winner (1): 2006/07,

External links
 Rugby Agrária

Portuguese rugby union teams
Polytechnic Institute of Coimbra
University and college rugby union clubs
University and college sports clubs in Portugal